Phillip George Bygrave (19 September 1929 – 24 October 2012) was a New Zealand field hockey player. He represented New Zealand in field hockey between 1954 and 1964, including at the 1956, 1960, and 1964 Olympic Games.

References

External links

1929 births
2012 deaths
Sportspeople from Te Aroha
New Zealand male field hockey players
Olympic field hockey players of New Zealand
Field hockey players at the 1956 Summer Olympics
Field hockey players at the 1960 Summer Olympics
Field hockey players at the 1964 Summer Olympics